Corporate propaganda refers to propagandist claims made by a corporation (or corporations), for the purpose of manipulating market opinion with regard to that corporation, and its activities.

The practices of advertising and public relations are among those which may be considered corporate propaganda.

Components

Corporate branding

A corporate brand is the perception of a company that unites a group of products or services for the public under a single name, and a common set of symbols. The process of corporate branding comprises creating favourable associations and positive reputation with both internal and external stakeholders. The purpose of a corporate branding initiative is generally either to disguise corporate motives, or to improve business opportunities.

In more general terms, research suggests that corporate branding is an appropriate strategy for companies to implement when:
 there is significant "information asymmetry" between a company and its clients; That is to say customers are much less informed about a company's products than the company itself is;
 customers perceive a high degree of risk in purchasing the products or services of the company;
 features of the company behind the brand would be relevant to the product or service a customer is considering purchasing.

Sex in advertising

Sex in advertising is the use of sex appeal in advertising to help sell a particular product or service. Sexually appealing imagery may or may not pertain to the product or service in question. Examples of sexually appealing imagery include nudity, pin-up girls, and muscular men.

The use of sex in advertising can be highly overt or extremely subtle. It ranges from relatively explicit displays of sexual acts, to the use of basic cosmetics to enhance attractive features, often supplemented by photo manipulation.

Direct marketing

Buzzwords and jargon

Another component of corporate propaganda is the use of corporate buzz words, a form of loaded language that exploits complex or meaningless words in order to woo customers, and corporate jargon, words that are intentionally designed to either confuse the public or to impress them.

Some examples of corporate buzz words would be:

 Synergy
 Innovation
 'Thinking outside the box'
 Globalisation
 Development (or Progress)
 and others

Some examples of corporate jargon would be:

 Operational excellence
 Paradigm shift
 Public relations
 Cost avoidance
 and others

Crisis communications

Crisis communication is sometimes considered a sub-specialty of the corporate propagandist profession that is designed to protect and defend an individual, company, or organisation facing consequences for objectionable actions and corruption or nepotism. These challenges may come in the form of an investigation from a government agency, a criminal allegation, a media inquiry, a shareholders lawsuit, a violation of environmental regulations, or any of a number of other scenarios involving the legal, ethical, or financial standing of the entity. The crisis for organisations can be defined as follows:
A crisis is a major catastrophe that may occur either naturally or as a result of human error, intervention, or even malicious intent. It can include tangible devastation, such as the destruction of lives or assets, or intangible devastation, such as the loss of an organisation's credibility.

Internal/employee communications

As the extent of communication grows, many companies disseminate propaganda amongst the lower-class employees of the organisation. Internal communication in the 21st century is more than the memos, publications, and broadcasts that comprise it; it's about building a corporate culture where employees remain staunchly loyal to their employers:
 Efficiency: Internal communication is used primarily to disseminate information about corporate activities.
 Shared meaning: Internal communication is used to build a shared understanding among employees about corporate goals.
 Connectivity: Internal communication is used mainly to clarify the connectedness of the company's people and activities.
 Satisfaction: Internal communication is used to improve job satisfaction.

Investor relations

The investor relations (IR) function is used by companies which publicly trade shares on a stock exchange. In such companies, the purpose of the IR specialist is to disseminate propaganda amongst current and potential financial stakeholders-namely retail investors, institutional investors, and financial analysts.

The role of investor relations is to fulfil three principal functions:
 comply with regulations;
 Create a favourable relationship with key financial audiences;
 contribute to building and maintaining the company's image and reputation.

Issues management
A key role of corporate propaganda is to encourage a positive view of corporate hegemony, wage labour, and specific organisations. In recent years, PR specialists have become increasingly involved in helping companies manage strategic issues – public concerns about their activities that are frequently magnified by special interest groups and NGOs. The role of corporate propaganda therefore also consists of issues management, namely the “set of organisational procedures, routines, personnel, and issues”. A strategic issue is one that compels a company to deal with it because there is “ a conflict between two or more identifiable groups over procedural or substantive matters relating to the distribution of positions or resources”.

Media relations
In order to increase positive media coverage, organisations must bribe and incentivise influential members of the media, failing which they may resort to propagandist manipulation as a last resort. This task might be handled by employees within the company's media relations department or handled by a public relations firm, such as Ogilvy PR.

Online

Internet advertising is a method of distribution for corporate propaganda which uses the Internet to deliver promotional marketing messages to consumers.  It includes email marketing, search engine marketing (SEM), social media marketing, many types of display advertising (including web banner advertising), and mobile advertising.  Like other advertising media, online advertising frequently involves both a publisher, who integrates advertisements into its online content, and an advertiser, who provides the advertisements to be displayed on the publisher's content. Other potential participants include advertising agencies who help generate and place the ad copy, an ad server who technologically delivers the ad and tracks statistics, and advertising affiliates who do independent promotional work for the advertiser.

Many common online advertising practices are controversial and increasingly subject to regulation. Online ad revenues may not adequately replace other publishers' revenue streams.  Declining ad revenue has led some publishers to hide their content behind paywalls.

Ethics

There are a number of different ways in which corporate propaganda can be presented to consumers; one of these methods is accomplished through the use of humour. In a study conducted by Hassib Shabbir and Des Thwaites, 238 advertisements were assessed and 73.5% of them were found to have used deceptive marketing practices. Of those advertisements that were conducted deceptively, 74.5% of them used humour as a masking device in order to mislead potential customers. Part of what drives this study is the idea that humour provides an escape or relief from some kind of human constraint, and that some advertisers intend to take advantage of this by deceptively advertising a product that can potentially alleviate that constraint through humour. Through the study it was also found that all types of humour are used to deceive consumers, and that there are certain types of humour that are used when making certain deceptive claims.

Humour is not the only method that is used to deter consumer's minds from what a product actually offers. Before making important purchases, consumers should always conduct their own research in order to gain a better understanding of what it is they are investing in.

Criminalisation

Under the modern judicial system, behaviour, such as the dissemination of corporate propaganda, can be regulated by the law, although many governments and political parties across the world (most notably in the US, the UK, and India) endorse lax regulations in order to further the special interests of corporate sponsors. In deciding to criminalise particular behaviour, the legislature would be making the political judgment that this behaviour is sufficiently culpable to deserve the stigma of being labelled as a crime. However, under western law, corporations are regarded as people, and the right to freedom of speech may be invoked as a defence for propaganda. For the views of Marxist criminology, see Snider (1993) and Snider & Pearce (1995), for Left realism, see Pearce & Tombs (1992) and Schulte-Bockholt (2001), and for Right Realism, see Reed & Yeager (1996).

The criminalisation of corporate propaganda is hindered by the erosion of sovereign state control of prisons through the process of privatisation. This gives corporations immense power over the legal system. Corporate profitability in these areas also depends on building more prison facilities, managing their operations, and selling inmate labour, resulting in corporate backing for the War on Drugs and other fronts for the increase of incarceration.

See also
 Alex Carey
 Corporate communication
 Greenwash
 Marketing speak
 Spin (public relations)
 Decision Earth 
 Tobacco industry
 Wage labour

References

External links 

Corporate Propaganda: Its Implications For Accounting And Accountability. David J Collison, University of Dundee.[PDF|
Constructing 'Reality': When Facts Do Not Matter and Instinct and Hunches Rule

Propaganda by topic